The St. Louis Cardinals 2005 season was the team's 124th season in St. Louis, Missouri and the 114th season in the National League.  The Cardinals went 100-62 during the season and won the National League Central division by 11 games over the NL Wild-Card Champion and eventual NL Champion Houston Astros.  In the playoffs the Cardinals swept the San Diego Padres 3 games to 0 in the NLDS.  However, the Cardinals lost to the Astros 4 games to 2 in the NLCS.

The season was the last one played in Busch Memorial Stadium by the Cardinals and they moved to the new Busch Stadium the next year.  The Cardinals also moved their radio broadcasts from KMOX after a 55-year affiliation to KTRS after the season.  After the 2010 season, the Cardinals would move their radio broadcasts from KTRS back to KMOX, starting in 2011.

First baseman Albert Pujols won the MVP Award this year, batting .330, with 41 home runs and 117 RBIs. Chris Carpenter won the Cy Young Award this year, with a 2.83 ERA, 21 wins, and 213 strikeouts. Outfielder Jim Edmonds won a Gold Glove this year. The Cardinals pitching staff led Major League Baseball by having the lowest (ERA) (3.49), conceding the fewest earned runs (560) and pitching the most complete games (15).

Offseason
December 18, 2004: Dan Haren was traded by the St. Louis Cardinals with Daric Barton and Kiko Calero to the Oakland Athletics for Mark Mulder.
February 21, 2005: Bill Pulsipher was signed as a free agent with the St. Louis Cardinals.

Regular season
A herniated disc in Larry Walker's neck prevented him from turning his head to the left. He received a second cortisone shot to alleviate the pain on June 27.  With eight previous surgeries and now playing with pain that impeded his ability to continue to produce at a high level, he signaled that he would retire from playing after the season.  He had $12 million team option for 2006.

On August 4, the Cardinals announced that they had bought a 50% share of KTRS 550 AM and was leaving the longtime flagship station KMOX 1120 AM after 52 years and transferring the games to KTRS in 2006.

The Cardinals clinched their fifth National League Central division title in six years on September 17 when they beat the Cubs 5-1.  The final regular season game at Busch Memorial Stadium took place on October 2, a 7-5 victory over the Cincinnati Reds.  Rookie Chris Duncan hit the final regular season home run at that version of Busch Stadium.

Game log

|- bgcolor=#ccffcc
| 1 || April 5 || @ Astros || 7–3 || Carpenter || Oswalt || Isringhausen || 43,567 || 1–0
|- bgcolor=#ffbbbb
| 2 || April 6 || @ Astros || 1–4 || Qualls || Tavárez || Lidge || 28,496 || 1–1
|- bgcolor=#ccffcc
| 3 || April 8 || Phillies || 6–5 || Reyes || Madson || Isringhausen || 50,074 || 2–1
|- bgcolor=#ffbbbb
| 4 || April 9 || Phillies || 4–10 || Floyd || Suppan || || 39,242 || 2–2
|- bgcolor=#ffbbbb
| 5 || April 10 || Phillies || 4–13 || Lieber || Carpenter || || 37,971 || 2–3
|- bgcolor=#ccffcc
| 6 || April 12 || Reds || 5–1 || Marquis || Harang || || 33,617 || 3–3
|- bgcolor=#ffbbbb
| 7 || April 13 || Reds || 5–6 || Belisle || Mulder || Graves || 28,772 || 3–4
|- bgcolor=#ccffcc
| 8 || April 15 || @ Brewers || 3–0 || Suppan || Sheets || Isringhausen || 22,676 || 4–4
|- bgcolor=#ccffcc
| 9 || April 16 || @ Brewers || 5–3 || Carpenter || Davis || Isringhausen || 30,732 || 5–4
|- bgcolor=#ccffcc
| 10 || April 17 || @ Brewers || 3–2 || Marquis || Adams || Isringhausen || 21,144 || 6–4
|- bgcolor=#ccffcc
| 11 || April 18 || @ Pirates || 11–1 || Mulder || D. Williams || || 11,220 || 7–4
|- bgcolor=#ccffcc
| 12 || April 19 || @ Pirates || 7–1 || Morris || Fogg || || 12,285 || 8–4
|- bgcolor=#ffbbbb
| 13 || April 20 || Cubs || 1–3 || Zambrano || Suppan || Hawkins || 44,855 || 8–5
|- bgcolor=#ccffcc
| 14 || April 21 || Cubs || 4–0 || Carpenter || Dempster ||  || 46,119 || 9–5
|- bgcolor=#ccffcc
| 15 || April 22 || Astros || 8–7 || Marquis || Duckworth || Isringhausen || 44,805 || 10–5
|- bgcolor=#ccffcc
| 16 || April 23 || Astros || 1–0 || Mulder || Qualls ||  || 40,058 || 11–5
|- bgcolor=#ccffcc
| 17 || April 24 || Astros || 8–5 || Morris || Backe || Isringhausen || 39,020 || 12–5
|- bgcolor=#ccffcc
| 18 || April 26 || Brewers || 5–3 || Suppan || Davis || Flores || 28,787 || 13–5
|- bgcolor=#ccffcc
| 19 || April 27 || Brewers || 6–3 || Carpenter || Santos || Tavárez || 38,343 || 14–5
|- bgcolor=#ffbbbb
| 20 || April 28 || Brewers || 3–4 || Capuano || Marquis || Turnbow || 26,026 || 14–6
|- bgcolor=#ccffcc
| 21 || April 29 || @ Braves || 6–5 || Mulder || Hudson || Reyes || 33,833 || 15–6
|- bgcolor=#ffbbbb
| 22 || April 30 || @ Braves || 2–3 || Kolb || Journell ||  || 35,789 || 15–7
|-

|- bgcolor=#ffbbbb
| 23 || May 1 || @ Braves || 1–2 || Smoltz || Suppan || Kolb || 34,304 || 15–8
|- bgcolor=#ccffcc
| 24 || May 2 || @ Reds || 10–9 || Flores || Graves || Tavárez || 15,961 || 16–8
|- bgcolor=#ccffcc
| 25 || May 3 || @ Reds || 4–2 || Marquis || Harang || Reyes || 16,512 || 17–8
|- bgcolor=#ccffcc
| 26 || May 4 || @ Reds || 7–3 || Mulder || Claussen || || 17,241 || 18–8
|- bgcolor=#ffbbbb
| 27 || May 5 || Padres || 3–8 || Hammond || King ||  || 30,507 || 18–9
|- bgcolor=#ffbbbb
| 28 || May 6 || Padres || 5–6 || Williams || Flores || Hoffman || 47,160 || 18–10
|- bgcolor=#ffbbbb
| 29 || May 7 || Padres || 4–5 || Eaton || Carpenter || Hoffman ||  || 18–11
|- bgcolor=#ccffcc
| 30 || May 8 || Padres || 15–5 || Marquis || Redding || Thompson || 46,444 || 19–11
|- bgcolor=#ccffcc
| 31 || May 9 || Dodgers || 4–2 || Mulder || Perez || Reyes || 37,194 || 20–11
|- bgcolor=#ffbbbb
| 32 || May 10 || Dodgers || 8–9 || Alvarez	|| Jarvis || Brazoban || 38,984 || 20–12
|- bgcolor=#ccffcc
| 33 || May 11 || Dodgers || 9–3 || Suppan || Penny ||  || 35,671 || 21–12
|- bgcolor=#ccffcc
| 34 || May 12 || Dodgers || 10–3 || Carpenter || Lowe ||  || 45,656 || 22–12
|- bgcolor=#ffbbbb
| 35 || May 13 || @ Mets || 0–2 || Glavine || Marquis || Looper || 43,495 || 22–13
|- bgcolor=#ccffcc
| 36 || May 14 || @ Mets || 7–6 || Tavárez || R. Hernandez || Isringhausen || 40,921 || 23–13
|- bgcolor=#ccffcc
| 37 || May 15 || @ Mets || 4–2 || Morris || Heilman || Isringhausen || 32,949 || 24–13
|- bgcolor=#ffbbbb
| 38 || May 17 || @ Phillies || 5–7 || Lidle || Suppan || Wagner || 32,103 || 24–14
|- bgcolor=#ccffcc
| 39 || May 18 || @ Phillies || 8–4 || Carpenter || Lieber ||  || 29,130 || 25–14
|- bgcolor=#ffbbbb
| 40 || May 19 || @ Phillies || 4–7 || Myers || Marquis ||  || 38,229 || 25–15
|- bgcolor=#ccffcc
| 41 || May 20 || @ Royals || 7–6 || Mulder || Greinke || Isringhausen || 31,513 || 26–15
|- bgcolor=#ccffcc
| 42 || May 21 || @ Royals || 6–5 || Morris || Cerda || Isringhausen || 39,781 || 27–15
|- bgcolor=#ffbbbb
| 43 || May 22 || @ Royals || 2–9 || Jensen || Suppan ||  || 29,269 || 27–16
|- bgcolor=#ccffcc
| 44 || May 23 || Pirates || 4–2 || Carpenter || D. Williams || Isringhausen || 33,073 || 28–16
|- bgcolor=#ccffcc
| 45 || May 24 || Pirates || 2–1 || Reyes || Mesa ||  || 36,285 || 29–16
|- bgcolor=#ccffcc
| 46 || May 25 || Pirates || 11–5 || Mulder || Redman ||  || 34,895 || 30–16
|- bgcolor=#ccffcc
| 47 || May 27 || Nationals || 6–3 || Morris || Armas || Isringhausen || 47,383 || 31–16
|- bgcolor=#ccffcc
| 48 || May 28 || Nationals || 3–1 || Suppan || Loaiza || Isringhausen || 49,123 || 32–16
|- bgcolor=#ffbbbb
| 49 || May 29 || Nationals || 2–3 || L. Hernandez || Carpenter || Cordero || 47,012 || 32–17
|- bgcolor=#ccffcc
| 50 || May 30 || @ Rockies || 5–4 || Marquis || Witasick || Isringhausen || 34,239 || 33–17
|- bgcolor=#ffbbbb
| 51 || May 31 || @ Rockies || 1–2 || Jennings || Mulder || Fuentes || 23,519 || 33–18
|-

|- bgcolor=#ccffcc
| 52 || June 1 || @ Rockies || 8–6 || Morris || Neal || Isringhausen || 22,266 || 34–18
|- bgcolor=#ffbbbb
| 53 || June 2 || @ Rockies || 7–8 || Fuentes || Isringhausen ||  || 21,381 || 34–19
|- bgcolor=#ccffcc
| 54 || June 3 || @ Astros || 2–0 || Carpenter || Pettitte || Tavárez || 34,092 || 35–19
|- bgcolor=#ccffcc
| 55 || June 4 || @ Astros || 11–9 || Marquis || Rodriguez || Isringhausen || 39,288 || 36–19
|- bgcolor=#ffbbbb
| 56 || June 5 || @ Astros || 4–6 || Clemens || Mulder || Lidge || 34,009 || 36–20
|- bgcolor=#ccffcc
| 57 || June 6 || Red Sox || 7–1 || Morris || Wakefield || || 50,270 || 37–20
|- bgcolor=#ccffcc
| 58 || June 7 || Red Sox || 9–2 || Suppan || Clement ||  || 47,496 || 38–20
|- bgcolor=#ffbbbb
| 59 || June 8 || Red Sox || 0–4 || Wells || Carpenter ||  || 46,928 || 38–21
|- bgcolor=#ccffcc
| 60 || June 10 || Yankees || 8–1 || Marquis || Wang ||  || 50,250 || 39–21
|- bgcolor=#ffbbbb
| 61 || June 11 || Yankees || 0–5 || Johnson || Mulder || Rivera || 50,177 || 39–22
|- bgcolor=#ccffcc
| 62 || June 12 || Yankees || 5–3 || King || Sturtze || Isringhausen || 50,372 || 40–22
|- bgcolor=#ffbbbb
| 63 || June 13 || @ Blue Jays || 1–4 || Halladay || Suppan ||  || 20,032 || 40–23
|- bgcolor=#ccffcc
| 64 || June 14 || @ Blue Jays || 7–0 || Carpenter || Gaudin ||  || 37,536 || 41–23
|- bgcolor=#ffbbbb
| 65 || June 15 || @ Blue Jays || 2–5 || Lilly || Marquis || Batista || 22,908 || 41–24
|- bgcolor=#ccffcc
| 66 || June 17 || @ Devil Rays || 6–4 || Mulder || Harper || Isringhausen || 19,099 || 42–24
|- bgcolor=#ccffcc
| 67 || June 18 || @ Devil Rays || 5–2 || Morris || Hendrickson || Isringhausen || 20,416 || 43–24
|- bgcolor=#ccffcc
| 68 || June 19 || @ Devil Rays || 8–5 || Suppan || Waechter || Isringhausen || 21,275 || 44–24
|- bgcolor=#ccffcc
| 69 || June 20 || @ Reds || 6–1 || Carpenter || Harang ||  || 22,035 || 45–24
|- bgcolor=#ffbbbb
| 70 || June 21 || @ Reds || 4–11 || Claussen || Marquis ||  || 22,268 || 45–25
|- bgcolor=#ffbbbb
| 71 || June 22 || @ Reds || 6–7 || Ortiz || Mulder || Mercker || 31,566 || 45–26
|- bgcolor=#ffbbbb
| 72 || June 23 || Pirates || 7–11 || Williams || Morris || R. White || 43,590 || 45–27
|- bgcolor=#ccffcc
| 73 || June 24 || Pirates || 8–1 || Suppan || Wells ||  || 48,184 || 46–27
|- bgcolor=#ccffcc
| 74 || June 25 || Pirates || 8–0 || Carpenter || Redman ||  || 48,413 || 47–27
|- bgcolor=#ffbbbb
| 75 || June 26 || Pirates || 4–5 || Grabow || Reyes || Mesa || 45,050 || 47–28
|- bgcolor=#ccffcc
| 76 || June 28 || Reds || 2–1 || Mulder || Claussen || Isringhausen || 38,640 || 48–28
|- bgcolor=#ccffcc
| 77 || June 29 || Reds || 11–3 || Morris || Ortiz ||  || 39,298 || 49–28
|- bgcolor=#ffbbbb
| 78 || June 30 || Rockies || 0–7 || Francis || Suppan ||  || 44,036 || 49–29
|-

|- bgcolor=#ccffcc
| 79 || July 1 || Rockies || 6–0 || Carpenter || Kennedy ||  || 40,128 || 50–29
|- bgcolor=#ffbbbb
| 80 || July 2 || Rockies || 1–3 || Wright || Marquis || Fuentes || 47,913 || 50–30
|- bgcolor=#ccffcc
| 81 || July 3 || Rockies || 5–4 || King || Witasick ||  || 47,811 || 51–30
|- bgcolor=#ccffcc
| 82 || July 4 || @ Dbacks || 10–3 || Morris || Webb ||  || 31,197 || 52–30
|- bgcolor=#ccffcc
| 83 || July 5 || @ Dbacks || 7–1 || Suppan || Estes ||  || 23,590 || 53–30
|- bgcolor=#ccffcc
| 84 || July 6 || @ Dbacks || 2–1 || Carpenter || Vazquez || Isringhausen || 21,076 || 54–30
|- bgcolor=#ffbbbb
| 85 || July 7 || @ Dbacks || 1–2 || Cormier || King ||  || 21,959 || 54–31
|- bgcolor=#ccffcc
| 86 || July 8 || @ Giants || 3–1 || Mulder || Schmidt || Isringhausen || 41,405 || 55–31
|- bgcolor=#ffbbbb
| 87 || July 9 || @ Giants || 0–2 || Hennessey || Morris || Walker || 42,423 || 55–32
|- bgcolor=#ccffcc
| 88 || July 10 || @ Giants || 4–3 || Suppan || Lowry || Isringhausen || 41,925 || 56–32
|- bgcolor=#ccffcc
| 89 || July 15 || Astros || 4–3 || Thompson || Harville ||  || 48,420 || 57–32
|- bgcolor=#ccffcc
| 90 || July 16 || Astros || 4–2 || Marquis || Oswalt || Isringhausen || 48,034 || 58–32
|- bgcolor=#ccffcc
| 91 || July 17 || Astros || 3–0 || Carpenter || Clemens ||  || 46,584 || 59–32
|- bgcolor=#ccffcc
| 92 || July 18 || Brewers || 11–4 || Morris || Santos ||  || 41,827 || 60–32
|- bgcolor=#ffbbbb
| 93 || July 19 || Brewers || 4–5 || Wise || Tavárez || Turnbow || 44,270 || 60–33
|- bgcolor=#ccffcc
| 94 || July 20 || Brewers || 4–2 || Mulder || Sheets || Isringhausen || 40,904 || 61–33
|- bgcolor=#ffbbbb
| 95 || July 21 || Brewers || 7–12 || Capuano || Marquis ||  || 44,002 || 61–34
|- bgcolor=#ccffcc
| 96 || July 22 || Cubs || 2–1 || Reyes || Mitre ||  || 49,840 || 62–34
|- bgcolor=#ffbbbb
| 97 || July 23 || Cubs || 5–6 || J. Williams || Morris || Dempster || 49,942 || 62–35
|- bgcolor=#ffbbbb
| 98 || July 24 || Cubs || 4–8 || Dempster || Reyes ||  || 49,762 || 62–36
|- bgcolor=#ccffcc
| 99 || July 26 || @ Padres || 4–2 || Mulder || Williams || Isringhausen || 36,659 || 63–36
|- bgcolor=#ffbbbb
| 100 || July 27 || @ Padres || 1–2 || Hoffman || Marquis ||  || 37,592 || 63–37
|- bgcolor=#ccffcc
| 101 || July 28 || @ Padres || 11–3 || Carpenter || Stauffer ||  || 38,760 || 64–37
|- bgcolor=#ffbbbb
| 102 || July 29 || @ Dodgers || 5–7 || Sanchez || Morris || Brazoban || 53,783 || 64–38
|- bgcolor=#ccffcc
| 103 || July 30 || @ Dodgers || 9–4 || Suppan || Lowe ||  || 47,805 || 65–38
|- bgcolor=#ccffcc
| 104 || July 31 || @ Dodgers || 7–5 || Eldred || Alvarez || Isringhausen || 44,543 || 66–38
|-

|- bgcolor=#ffbbbb
| 105 || August 1 || Marlins || 5–6 || Valdez || Marquis || T. Jones || 43,403 || 66–39
|- bgcolor=#ccffcc
| 106 || August 2 || Marlins || 3–1 || Carpenter || Willis ||  || 43,557 || 67–39
|- bgcolor=#ccffcc
| 107 || August 3 || Marlins || 9–6 || Morris || Villone ||  || 43,111 || 68–39
|- bgcolor=#ffbbbb
| 108 || August 4 || Marlins || 3–4 || Burnett || Suppan || T. Jones || 44,201 || 68–40
|- bgcolor=#ccffcc
| 109 || August 5 || Braves || 11–3 || Mulder || Smoltz ||  || 47,838 || 69–40
|- bgcolor=#ffbbbb
| 110 || August 6 || Braves || 1–8 || Hudson || Marquis ||  || 48,565 || 69–41
|- bgcolor=#ccffcc
| 111 || August 7 || Braves || 5–3 || King || Reitsma ||  || 47,714 || 70–41
|- bgcolor=#ccffcc
| 112 || August 8 || @ Brewers || 8–4 || Flores || Wise ||  || 30,260 || 71–41
|- bgcolor=#ccffcc
| 113 || August 9 || @ Brewers || 5–2 || Reyes || Davis || Isringhausen || 28,556 || 72–41
|- bgcolor=#ccffcc
| 114 || August 10 || @ Brewers || 3–0 || Suppan || Sheets || Isringhausen || 37,650 || 73–41
|- bgcolor=#ffbbbb
| 115 || August 11 || @ Cubs || 4–11 || Maddux || Mulder ||  || 38,170 || 73–42
|- bgcolor=#ffbbbb
| 116 || August 12 || @ Cubs || 1–4 || Zambrano || Marquis ||  || 39,717 || 73–43
|- bgcolor=#ccffcc
| 117 || August 13 || @ Cubs || 5–2 || Carpenter || J. Williams ||  || 39,923 || 74–43
|- bgcolor=#ffbbbb
| 118 || August 14 || @ Cubs || 4–5 || Prior || Morris || Dempster || 39,311 || 74–44
|- bgcolor=#ccffcc
| 119 || August 16 || Dbacks || 8–2 || Suppan || Halsey ||  || 42,198 || 75–44
|- bgcolor=#ccffcc
| 120 || August 17 || Dbacks || 5–0 || Mulder || Webb ||  || 41,407 || 76–44
|- bgcolor=#ffbbbb
| 121 || August 18 || Dbacks || 2–9 || Vargas || Marquis ||  || 44,625 || 76–45
|- bgcolor=#ccffcc
| 122 || August 19 || Giants || 5–4 || Tavárez || Accardo ||  || 46,200 || 77–45
|- bgcolor=#ccffcc
| 123 || August 20 || Giants || 4–2 || Morris || Correia || Isringhausen || 47,169 || 78–45
|- bgcolor=#ffbbbb
| 124 || August 21 || Giants || 2–4 || Schmidt || Suppan || Benitez || 46,113 || 78–46
|- bgcolor=#ccffcc
| 125 || August 22 || @ Pirates || 3–1 || Mulder || Fogg || Isringhausen || 23,751 || 79–46
|- bgcolor=#ffbbbb
| 126 || August 23 || @ Pirates || 0–10 || Torres || Marquis ||  || 23,948 || 79–47
|- bgcolor=#ccffcc
| 127 || August 24 || @ Pirates || 8–3 || Carpenter || Wells ||  || 21,506 || 80–47
|- bgcolor=#ccffcc
| 128 || August 25 || @ Pirates || 6–3 || Morris || D. Williams || Isringhausen || 24,626 || 81–47
|- bgcolor=#ffbbbb
| 129 || August 26 || @ Nationals || 1–4 || Loaiza || Suppan || Cordero || 37,885 || 81–48
|- bgcolor=#ccffcc
| 130 || August 27 || @ Nationals || 6–0 || Marquis || White ||  || 44,254 || 82–48
|- bgcolor=#ccffcc
| 131 || August 28 || @ Nationals || 6–0 || Thompson || Halama ||  || 41,130 || 83–48
|- bgcolor=#ccffcc
| 132 || August 29 || @ Marlins || 6–1 || Carpenter || Burnett ||  || 18,388 || 84–48
|- bgcolor=#ffbbbb
| 133 || August 30 || @ Marlins || 6–7 || Mota || Morris || T. Jones || 20,073 || 84–49
|- bgcolor=#ccffcc
| 134 || August 31 || @ Marlins || 10–5 || Suppan || Vargas ||  || 20,656 || 85–49
|-

|- bgcolor=#ffbbbb
| 135 || September 2 || @ Astros || 5–6 || Qualls || Tavárez || || 38,511 || 85–50
|- bgcolor=#ccffcc
| 136 || September 3 || @ Astros || 4–2 || Carpenter || Springer ||  || 42,817 || 86–50
|- bgcolor=#ccffcc
| 137 || September 4 || @ Astros || 4–1 || Marquis || Rodriguez ||  || 38,277 || 87–50
|- bgcolor=#ccffcc
| 138 || September 5 || Cubs || 6–4 || King || Novoa || Tavárez || 49,646 || 88–50
|- bgcolor=#ffbbbb
| 139 || September 6 || Cubs || 2–5 || Rusch || Morris || Dempster || 47,292 || 88–51
|- bgcolor=#ffbbbb
| 140 || September 7 || Cubs || 1–2 || Maddux || Mulder || Dempster || 47,789 || 88–52
|- bgcolor=#ccffcc
| 141 || September 8 || Mets || 5–0 || Carpenter || Benson ||  || 47,422 || 89–52
|- bgcolor=#ccffcc
| 142 || September 9 || Mets || 3–2 || Marquis || Seo || Isringhausen || 45,616 || 90–52
|- bgcolor=#ccffcc
| 143 || September 10 || Mets || 4–2 || Suppan || Trachsel || Isringhausen || 48,465 || 91–52
|- bgcolor=#ffbbbb
| 144 || September 11 || Mets || 2–7 || Martinez || Morris ||  || 45,884 || 91–53
|- bgcolor=#ccffcc
| 145 || September 12 || Pirates || 4–3 || Isringhausen || Torres ||  || 40,064 || 92–53
|- bgcolor=#ccffcc
| 146 || September 13 || Pirates || 5–4 || Thompson || R. White ||  || 40,599 || 93–53
|- bgcolor=#ffbbbb
| 147 || September 14 || Pirates || 3–5 || Vogelsong || Marquis || M. Gonzalez || 40,172 || 93–54
|- bgcolor=#ccffcc
| 148 || September 15 || @ Cubs || 6–1 || Suppan || Prior ||  || 37,849 || 94–54
|- bgcolor=#ffbbbb
| 149 || September 16 || @ Cubs || 3–5 || Rusch || Morris || Dempster || 38,080 || 94–55
|- bgcolor=#ccffcc
| 150 || September 17 || @ Cubs || 5–1 || Mulder || Maddux ||  || 39,269 || 95–55
|- bgcolor=#ffbbbb
| 151 || September 18 || @ Cubs || 4–7 || Zambrano || Reyes ||  || 38,182 || 95–56
|- bgcolor=#ffbbbb
| 152 || September 20 || @ Reds || 5–6 || Hancock || King || Weathers || 16,587 || 95–57
|- bgcolor=#ccffcc
| 153 || September 21 || @ Reds || 5–1 || Marquis || Ortiz ||  || 16,784 || 96–57
|- bgcolor=#ffbbbb
| 154 || September 22 || @ Reds || 2–6 || Coffey || King ||  || 17,461 || 96–58
|- bgcolor=#ffbbbb
| 155 || September 23 || @ Brewers || 6–9 || Capuano || Carpenter || Turnbow || 22,472 || 96–59
|- bgcolor=#ffbbbb
| 156 || September 24 || @ Brewers || 7–8 || Glover || Mulder || Turnbow || 33,506 || 96–60
|- bgcolor=#ccffcc
| 157 || September 25 || @ Brewers || 2–0 || Suppan || Davis || Isringhausen || 20,150 || 97–60
|- bgcolor=#ffbbbb
| 158 || September 27 || Astros || 1–3 || Oswalt || Morris || Lidge || 40,260 || 97–61
|- bgcolor=#ffbbbb
| 159 || September 28 || Astros || 6–7 || Qualls || Isringhausen || Lidge || 40,616 || 97–62
|- bgcolor=#ccffcc
| 160 || September 30 || Reds || 12–6 || Reyes || Hudson ||  || 47,257 || 98–62
|-

|- bgcolor=#ccffcc
| 161 || October 1 || Reds || 9–6 || Flores || Simpson || Isringhausen || 49,487 || 99–62
|- bgcolor=#ccffcc
| 162 || October 2 || Reds || 7–5 || Thompson || Claussen || Isringhausen || 50,434 || 100–62
|-

Postseason Game Log

|- bgcolor=#ccffcc
| 1 || October 4 || Padres || 8–5 || Carpenter || Peavy ||  || 52,349 || 1–0
|- bgcolor=#ccffcc
| 2 || October 6 || Padres || 6–2 || Mulder || Astacio ||  || 52,599 || 2–0
|- bgcolor=#ccffcc
| 3 || October 8 || @ Padres || 7–4 || Morris || W. Williams || Isringhausen || 45,093 || 3–0
|-

|- bgcolor=#ccffcc
| 1 || October 12 || Astros || 5–3 || Carpenter || Pettitte || Isringhausen || 52,332 || 1–0
|- bgcolor=#ffbbbb
| 2 || October 13 || Astros || 1–4 || Oswalt || Mulder || Lidge || 52,358 || 1–1
|- bgcolor=#ffbbbb
| 3 || October 15 || @ Astros || 3–4 || Clemens || Morris || Lidge || 42,823 || 1–2
|- bgcolor=#ffbbbb
| 4 || October 16 || @ Astros || 1–2 || Qualls ||  || Lidge || 43,010 || 1–3
|- bgcolor=#ccffcc
| 5 || October 17 || @ Astros || 5–4 || Isringhausen || Lidge ||  || 43,470 || 2–3
|- bgcolor=#ffbbbb
| 6 || October 19 || Astros || 1–5 || Oswalt || Mulder ||  || 52,438 || 2–4
|-

Season standings

National League Central

Record vs. opponents

Transactions
July 29, 2005: Alan Benes was signed as a free agent with the St. Louis Cardinals.
September 6, 2005: Bill Pulsipher was released by the St. Louis Cardinals.

Roster

Player stats

Batting

Starters by position
Note: Pos = Position; G = Games played; AB = At bats; H = Hits; Avg. = Batting average; HR = Home runs; RBI = Runs batted in

Other batters
Note: G = Games played; AB = At bats; H = Hits; Avg. = Batting average; HR = Home runs; RBI = Runs batted in

Pitching

Starting pitchers
Note: G = Games pitched; IP = Innings pitched; W = Wins; L = Losses; ERA = Earned run average; SO = Strikeouts

Other pitchers
Note: G = Games pitched; IP = Innings pitched; W = Wins; L = Losses; ERA = Earned run average; SO = Strikeouts

Relief pitchers
Note: G = Games pitched; W = Wins; L = Losses; SV = Saves; ERA = Earned run average; SO = Strikeouts

NLDS

St. Louis Cardinals vs. San Diego Padres
St. Louis wins series, 3-0.

NLCS

Down to their last out and strike and facing elimination in game 5 of the 2005 National League Championship Series, David Eckstein hit a single in the hole on the left side off of the Astros' Brad Lidge to bring the tying run to the plate. The next batter, Jim Edmonds, worked a base on balls. Albert Pujols followed with a 412-foot home run onto the train tracks behind left field (had the game been played with the roof open, the drive would have exited Minute Maid Park, as it first hit off the glass wall which forms part of the roof), to put the Cardinals ahead 5–4.  The roar of the crowd, anticipating the end of the game that would signal the Astros' entrance into the World Series, was hushed as they watched Pujols' home run (one of the announcers described it as a "vacuum" from the sudden intake of air by the crowd).  Houston was then shut down in the bottom of the 9th by the Cardinals' closer Jason Isringhausen to preserve the win, guaranteeing at least one more game at old Busch Stadium. However, the Astros dominated Game 6, shutting the Cardinals down 5–1 for their first berth in the World Series in franchise history.  Walker struck out in the ninth inning, his final major league at bat.  He retired shortly after the game.

Awards and honors
 Cy Young Award:  Chris Carpenter
 MVP:  Albert Pujols

Farm system

References

External links
2005 St. Louis Cardinals at Baseball Reference
2005 St. Louis Cardinals team page at www.baseball-almanac.com

St. Louis Cardinals seasons
National League Central champion seasons
St Louis Cardinals Season, 2005
St. Louis Cardinals